The Fiat 500L is a car manufactured by Fiat under the FCA Serbia joint venture and marketed globally since its debut at the 2012 Geneva Motor Show. It is classified as a Mini MPV.

Based on a variant of the FCA Small Wide platform, the 500L uses Fiat's Multiair variable valve timing engine technology and monovolume cab forward architecture:  a packaging concept that prioritizes passenger and cargo volume. The 500L is noted for its high H-point seating, high roof, tall greenhouse, double A pillar, wide field of visibility — and its reconfigurable interior system marketed as Cargo Magic Space.

Initially only available in a 2-row, 5-seat configuration, the lengthened 3-row, 7-seat variant, called the "500L Living", began production in 2013 for the European market. For model year 2018, the 500L received an intermediate facelift, with revised front and rear fascias along with In-car entertainment (ICE) updates and interior revisions.  By early 2018, production reached 500,000 units. The 500L was discontinued in the North American market after model year 2020.

The 500L derives its name from Fiat's widely known 500 models, including the original 1957 Fiat 500 and the current Fiat 500, introduced in 2007. Underscoring its increased length and overall size over other 500 variants, the suffix L denotes "large", "light" and "loft".

Development
In April 2010, when Fiat released its 2010-2014 product development plan, the 500L was identified as a replacement for the Fiat Idea and its rebadged variant, the Lancia Musa — and was given the internal designation L0 or Ellezero. Two variants were projected, five and seven passenger, the latter originally targeted at North America but ultimately only marketed in Europe.

The 500L platform was based on Fiat's "Small" platform, first used with the Fiat Grande Punto and further developed since its launch in 2005.  With the 500L, the platform is both longer and wider to accommodate the 500L's cab forward architecture, prioritizing interior volume and reducing of the volume of mechanical systems.

The packaging design closely follows the Lancia Megagamma concept, which Fiat had commissioned from Italdesign in 1979, for a 4-meter, high roof, high h-point, multifunctional, monospace design.

Designers of the 500L said its overall architecture was inspired by Villa Savoye, the modernist house designed in the 1930s by Le Corbusier located in Poissy, France. Fabrizio Vacca, senior interior designer with Fiat's Centro Stile in Turin described a "layered" theme with a base, a middle with expansive visibility and above that an available, very large, dual-pane panoramic sunroof.

At the 500L's introduction, Fiat presented a 96-page, multi-language PDF vade mecum (handbook) titled 500L A Design Approach, tracing the design of the vehicle.

Design
As a five-door, five passenger, two-box, high-roof B-segment MPV, the 500L is based on a variant of the GM Fiat Small platform and uses Fiat's Multiair engines, a hydraulically-actuated variable valve timing (VVT) engine technology enabling "cylinder by cylinder, stroke by stroke" control of intake air directly via a gasoline engine's inlet valves.

The 500L's cab forward architecture provides a total passenger and cargo volume of 121.1 cubic feet, and features high H-point seating, tall roof and greenhouse, split front glass (A) pillar and polycarbonate rear (D) pillar, making the Fiat 500L the first production vehicle to use polycarbonate windows. The split A-pillar and tall greenhouse contribute to the interior's wide field of visibility.

Bodywork features a reconfigurable interior system marketed as Cargo Magic Space, which includes a three-level rear cargo floor panel, fold-flat front passenger seat, and rear seating that can recline for passenger comfort, slide for/aft to reprioritize cargo and passenger volume, and fold and tumble forward to store the second row seating and maximize interior cargo volume.

The 500L's structural architecture uses 74% high strength steel (HSS) and complies with international safety standards. With three front-end load (crash) dissipation paths the design  has wide rear door openings;  roof pillars that enable a 90% visibility for the driver's 360° field of view. Bodywork has a frontal area of 2.54 m2 and a low aerodynamic coefficient of drag (cd) of 0.30 enabled by rear spoiler, underbody engine and rear suspension shields, and integral rear side window nolder profiles (i.e., small aerodynamic lips) to decrease pressure behind the bodywork and reduce mud and debris build-up on the rear window.

The 500L uses shock absorbers (marketed as Koni Frequency Selective Damping (FSD) Technology) designed to filter out high-frequency suspension inputs from uneven road surfaces while maintaining ride control mechanically rather than electronically.

The 500L's sunroof is 10.8 sf, the largest in its class.

An optional Beats Audio system which claims a total power of 520 watts with two 80 watt mid-woofer speakers low in the front door panels, two 40 watt speakers high in the front door panels, two 60 watt speakers in the rear door panels, an 80+80 watt subwoofer in the rear cargo area and an amplifier with DSP and 8 channels and a built-in advanced equalisation algorithm.

Production

Introduction
In 2012, the 500L debuted formally at the Geneva Auto Show — followed by a media introduction at the Officine Grandi Riparazioni (OGR), the former Grand Repair Workshops of the Italian Railway, now a cultural center located at Corso Castelfidardo 22 in Turin — on 4 July, the day of the year when Fiat has historically introduced its 500 models. The introduction presentation was built around the 500L themes of Large (a large MPV within a 4.1 meter footprint), Light (a light eco-footprint), and Loft (an expansive, lofty interior).

FCA Serbia inaugurated its reconstructed and renovated facilities in Kragujevac in April 2011 — with production commencing 26 May 2012.

The 500L went on sale in Italy in September 2012, with sales begin in October 2012 for the remainder of Europe.

Manufacture
Manufacture of the 500L began at Fiat's Kragujevac plant in Serbia, — a joint venture (JV) between Fiat Chrysler Automobiles (FCA) which owns 67% of the operation and the Republic of Serbia, which owns the remainder.  The facilities had previously served as the factory and headquarters for Zastava Automobiles.

Between 2010 and 2012, FCA invested more than €1B and three years to upgrade the plant infrastructure, restore its buildings, develop new production departments and install state of the art machinery and production systems. A co-located automotive supplier park includes sub-works for Magneti Marelli (exhaust and catalytic converters), Johnson Controls MM (instrument panels, interior, interior parts and plastic parts), Magneti Marelli (bumpers and spoilers), Dräxlmaier (electrical), with other works at the nearby Grosnica Supplier Park, including Johnson Controls (seats), PMC (suspension systems, sheet metal stampings and chassis assemblies), SIGIT (rubber and plastic parts) as well as HTL.

500L production was originally scheduled for manufacture at the Italian Mirafiori plant in Turin and was moved to Serbia,  because of poor labour relations in Turin.

Approximately one percent of 500L production is expected to be sold in Serbia, with 90% exported from Serbia via the port of Bar, Montenegro.

In 2013, a ship carrying the first 3,000 Fiat 500L units for the North American market docked in the port of Baltimore to unload its first consignment, subsequently delivering the remainder of its cargo to the Canadian port of Halifax.

Trim levels
Fiat markets the 500L in various trim levels worldwide, beginning in 2014 in the US with four trim levels: Pop, Easy, Trekking, and Lounge — subsequently consolidated to three levels with model year 2017.  Trim levels available globally include Sport in Canada in lieu of Easy — and Pop Star in Europe. Engine and transmission options vary by country and model year.  Available transmissions include a six-speed manual, dual-clutch transmission (DCT), and an Aisin six-speed traditional torque converter automatic.

The entry level trim, typically marketed as Pop, includes electrically operated windows and door locks, Uconnect 5.0 system with 5-inch touchscreen interface, handsfree calling, Bluetooth-streaming audio, voice-controllable radio, hill start assist and a reconfigurable interior design marketed as Magic Cargo Space, which includes a three-level rear cargo floor panel, fold-flat front passenger seat as well as for-aft sliding, fold and tumble, reclining rear seating.  Typically no option packages are offered.

Upper trim levels (variously marketed as Easy, Sport, Pop Star or Lounge) include more standard features and numerous option packages, including satellite navigation, leather trim, heated front seats, dual-pane panoramic sunroof or fixed sunroof (Europe), 6.5" Uconnect system, roof colour options, fog lights, power outlets, illuminated visor mirrors and chrome trim.

Trekking models, first presented at the 2012 LA Auto Show feature revised front and rear fascias, optional two-tone Nero/Marrone (black/brown) interior upholstery and distinct options packages. In 2017, the Fiat 500L Trekking is renamed Fiat 500L Weekend in some markets, including France.

To complement the regular length 500L, codenamed Fiat L0 (or Ellezero) (design code 330), in 2013 Fiat began marketing a lengthened seven-seat variant in Europe known as the 500L Living (or MPW in Ireland and the UK), developed under project code L1, Elleuno, or design code 334.

The 500L was the first production car with an optional in-vehicle espresso machine.

In 2021, new 500 family Hey Google series debuts with Google assistant, so customers can connect to their car even when they are away from it, using their own voice to request and receive information on the car and to interact with it. They can do so via their smartphone or the Google Nest Hub.

2017 update

For model year 2018, all models received slightly-revised exterior styling, as well as interior revisions, including a TFT color instrument display screen centered on the instrument panel, replacing the previous monochrome LCD instrument display screen.

A new Uconnect 4C 7.0 infotainment system, replaces the Uconnect 3 5.0BT and Uconnect 3C 6.5N units. The new unit includes an AM-FM radio tuner with Radio Data System (RDS), SiriusXM Satellite Radio.

Engine and transmission options include either a 6-speed manual or Aisin 6-speed automatic, the latter as the sole transmission for the North American market.

With the facelift, the seven-seat model was renamed the 500L Wagon (including in Ireland and in the UK, where pre-facelift models had a different name than anywhere else). The Fiat 500L Trekking (Fiat 500L Weekend in France) was renamed the Fiat 500L Cross Look (Fiat 500L Cross in France, and later Fiat 500L City Cross, and then just 500L).

Engines
For most markets, the 500L is available with a range of petrol and diesel engines: the 2-cylinder 0.9 L Twin Air and the 4-cylinder 1.4 L petrol, and the 1.3 L and 1.6 L MultiJet II common rail diesel engines. In North America the 500L is available with only a single 1.4 L turbo petrol engine, not available in Europe. A "Natural Power" methane powered version of the 0.9 L Twin Air is available in selected European markets.

All petrol models are equipped with a 6-speed manual transmission, with an automatic option only in North America. The 1.3 L diesel is available with a 5-speed manual or a 5-speed automated manual transmission called "MTA Dualogic". The 1.6 diesel is only available with a 6-speed manual.

The 1.6 MultiJet II  and 1.4 T-Jet  engine versions for the 500L, 500L Trekking and 500L Living were unveiled in Frankfurt Motor Show 2013.

For 2014 three new engine options (1.6 MultiJet II (120PS) turbo diesel, 1.4 T-Jet (120PS) petrol, 1.4 Turbo LPG) were announced for all 500L derivatives. A 1.4 turbo LPG engine models of 2014 Fiat 500L would be available at later date.

*Source:

Safety
The 500L has disc brakes on all wheels.

Euro NCAP

IIHS
The 2014 Fiat 500L was tested by the Insurance Institute for Highway Safety (IIHS), and it received a Top Safety Pick award:

Marketing
For the USA introduction of the 500L, Fiat launched a commercial created by the Doner Company filmed in Old Salem, North Carolina and starring Bryce Pinkham.  Titled "Italian Invasion," the ad showed Paul Revere noticing an Italian rather than British Invasion.

For the 2013 launch of the 500L Trekking, Fiat broadcast a commercial by the agency Leo Burnett promoting its suitability for everyday adventuring.

Fiat 500L models were used in 2014 Sochi Winter Olympics by the Italian team.

FCA donated eight dark grey 500Ls for Pope Francis's 2015 visit to the United States, two of which the Pope rode in. After serving the Pope, the cars were donated to organizations involved in the Pope's visit, including the Archdioceses of Washington, Philadelphia, and New York.

Discontinuation 
7-seat 500L Wagon was discontinued in 2021. It exited some major export markets some years before (United Kingdom mid-2018, France late 2019).

Sales

The 500L was the best-selling car in Serbia in 2013 and from 2015 to 2017. Serbia is not included in above Europe figures.

Concept models
2013 SEMA concepts: Two special versions of the 500L were unveiled in 2013 SEMA Show with a "surf and turf" theme. The 500L Adventurer is a version of 5-seat Fiat 500L with bright white body colour, with Mopar roof rails and a roof basket, and many other accessories from the Mopar range. The 500L Thalassa is based on the Fiat 500 Beach Cruiser from 2012, with bright orange body work and 18"  orange wheels and other Mopar accessories.

2014 Fiat 500L Beats Edition: The Beats Edition was produced in association with artist and record producer Dr. Dre, Interscope Geffen A&M Records chairman and record producer Jimmy Iovine, with two-tone grey/black livery in matt or gloss finish and new interior trim. It went on sale in spring 2014 Italy, and subsequently in other markets.

Notes

References

External links

Official Fiat 500L page

500L
Front-wheel-drive vehicles
Compact MPVs
Mini MPVs
Euro NCAP small MPVs
2010s cars
Cars introduced in 2012